M119 or M-119 may refer to:

Mercedes-Benz M119 engine, a V8 automobile engine
M119 howitzer, a lightweight howitzer used by the United States Army
M-119 (Michigan highway), a state highway in Michigan